Secunderabad, also spelled as Sikandarabad, is a twin city of Hyderabad and one of the six zones of the Greater Hyderabad Municipal Corporation (GHMC) in the Indian state of Telangana. It is the headquarters of the South Central Railway zone. Named after the Mir Akbar Ali Khan Sikander Jah, Asaf Jah III, Nizam of the Asaf Jahi dynasty, Secunderabad was established in 1806 as a British cantonment. Although both the cities are together referred to as the twin cities, Hyderabad and Secunderabad have different histories and cultures, with Secunderabad having developed directly under British rule until 1948, and Hyderabad as the capital of the Nizams' princely state of Hyderabad.

Geographically divided from Hyderabad by the Hussain Sagar lake, Secunderabad is no longer a separate municipal unit and has become part of Hyderabad's Greater Hyderabad Municipal Corporation. Both cities are collectively known as Hyderabad and together form the sixth-largest metropolis in India. Being one of the largest cantonments in India, Secunderabad has a large presence of army and air force personnel.

History 

In 1310 the area of present day Hyderabad and Secunderabad came under the rule of the Delhi Sultanate after the capture of Warangal, the Kakatiya capital. The modern city of Hyderabad was built and founded in 1592 by the Golconda Sultanate under Muhammad Quli Qutb Shah. The modern Secunderabad is also the site where the then Mughal emperor Ahmad Shah Bahadur was defeated in the year 1754 by the Maratha Empire; the emperor arrived after the death of Nawab Anwaruddin Khan nearby at the Battle of Ambur in 1749. Anwaruddin Khan was the Nawab of Arcot.

The area around Secunderbad changed hands between various rulers, and the area was part of Nizam's Hyderabad by the 18th century.

Modern Secunderabad was founded as a British cantonment after Nizam Asaf Jah II was defeated by the British East India Company. He was then forced to sign the 1798 Treaty of Subsidiary Alliance  to get the favor of British troops camped in the village of Ulwul, north-east of Hussain Sagar, the lake that separates Secunderabad from its twin city Hyderabad. In 1803, Nizam Sikandar Jah, the third Nizam of Hyderabad, changed Ulwul's name to Secunderabad after himself. The city was formed in 1806, after the order was signed by the Nizam allotting the land north of Hussain Sagar to set up the British Cantonment.

The twin cities are separated by the man-made Hussain Sagar lake, which was built during the reign of the Qutb Shahi dynasty in the 16th century. Unlike Hyderabad, the official language of Secunderabad was English.
Secunderabad was exempted from customs duty on imported goods, thus making trade very profitable. Various new markets such as Regimental Bazaar and General Bazaar were created. After the First War of Indian Independence of 1857, the construction of a  wall was started at Trimulgherry and completed in 1867.

Secunderabad Junction railway station, one of the largest in India and the zonal headquarters of South Central Railway, was established in 1874. The King Edward Memorial Hospital, now known as Gandhi Hospital, was established in 1851. A civil jail (now a heritage building known as Old Jail complex near Monda Market) was also established. Originally constructed in 1860 as the country house of the British Resident at Hyderabad, the Residency House is now known as the Rashtrapati Nilayam, the official retreat of the President of India.

Sir Winston Churchill, the prime minister of the United Kingdom during World War II, was posted in Secunderabad during the 1890s as a subaltern in the British Army. Sir Ronald Ross conducted his initial research on the cause of malaria in the city of Secunderabad. The original building is today called the Sir Ronald Ross Institute and is located on Minister Road.

Secunderabad Municipality was first formed in 1945. Later in 1950, along with Hyderabad Municipality, it was upgraded to Secunderabad Municipal Corporation under the Hyderabad Corporation Act, 1950. In 1960, by the Hyderabad Municipal Corporation Act of 1955, Secunderabad Municipal Corporation was merged with Hyderabad Corporation to form a single municipal corporation. Today Secunderabad is part of the Hyderabad district.

Post-Independence, the Secunderabad Cantonment Board came under the jurisdiction of the Indian Armed forces. Consequently, large military units were established. The popular neighbourhoods in Secunderabad are Paradise Circle, Trimulgherry, Jawaharnagar colony, Marredpally, Jeera, General Bazar, Sitaphalmandi, Kharkhana, Ranigunj, and New Bhoiguda. Begumpet Airport is close to Secunderabad and served the twin city until early 2008.

Geography 

Secunderabad has an average elevation of 543 metres (1781 ft). Most of the area has a rocky terrain and some areas are hilly.

It is connected to Hyderabad by Rastrapathi Road (formerly known as King's Way) and MG Road (formerly known as James' Street) via Tank Bund. As a constituent of Greater Hyderabad, Secunderabad is one of the largest metropolitan areas in India. Lot of residential areas are located nearby like West Marredpally, East Marredpally, Kharkhana, Bowenpally as it is calm and serene.

Climate 

Secunderabad has a tropical savanna climate (Köppen: Aw) bordering on a hot semi-arid climate (Köppen: BSh), with hot summers from late March to early May, the monsoon season from late June to early October, and a pleasant winter from late November to early February. In the evenings and mornings, the climate is relatively cool. Most of the rainfall is concentrated in the monsoon months from June to September.

Administration
 Secunderabad City
 Secunderabad Cantonment Board

Demographics 
Secunderabad had a population of 204,182. Males constituted 51% of the population and females 49%. Secunderabad had an average literacy rate of 73%, male literacy was 78%, and female literacy was 68%. 11% of the population was under 6 years of age. The city has a sizable population of Anglo-Indians, who mainly resided in the South Lallaguda area of Secunderabad which was popularly known as Little England. Many Anglo-Indians have emigrated to other countries in the English-speaking world over the last few decades.

Culture 

Due to the presence of communities such as Parsis and Anglo-Indians alongside British and native inhabitants, Secunderabad was historically a cosmopolitan city. Secunderabad used to be referred to by the locals as Lashkar, meaning the army and the city's culture reflected the same. Secunderabad was a liberal city compared to Hyderabad due to the presence of the British. Plaza cinema was the only theatre in India where viewers could sip a beer while watching a movie. Sangeet was a popular cinema theatre that screened only Western movies.

The popular Secunderabad Club was established in 1878, at a country house gifted by Salar Jung I. Secunderabad has a more laid-back atmosphere because it is mainly a residential area with fewer government offices and corporate establishments.

Many outdoor events such as the Republic Day parade and fairs are held in the Gymkhana or Parade grounds. Christmas is celebrated by the Christian residents. An annual festival known as the Bonalu is celebrated by the Hindus of the Telangana state. It is usually held during the Ashadha, which is at the start of the monsoon season. Ramadan, the Islamic holy month of fasting, is observed by the local Muslims. There are old temples like Laxminarayana Swami Temple and Mahakali Temple. Local churches like Wesely church and St. Mary's church add to cosmopolitan culture of the city. The culture of Secunderabad is distinctly different from that of Hyderabad's Nawabi culture.

Economy 

ITC, Infosys, Intergraph, and Coromandel International are some of the major private companies which have their offices in Secunderabad. Being the headquarters of South Central Railway, Secunderabad is a major centre for railway activity. Industrial areas such as Bolarum, Moula-Ali, Nacharam, Ghatkesar, Uppal, etc. are in Secunderabad. Secunderabad Cantonment Board houses a large number of defence units. Units of the Department of Atomic Energy (DAE), such as Atomic Minerals Directorate for Exploration and Research (AMD), Nuclear Fuel Complex (NFC), and ECIL are close to Secunderabad.

Government 

The Greater Hyderabad Municipal Corporation (GHMC), established in 2007, is responsible for the administration and infrastructure of Secunderabad. Secunderabad Municipality was first formed in 1945. Later in 1950, along with Hyderabad Municipality, it was upgraded to Secunderabad Municipal Corporation under the Hyderabad Corporation Act of 1950. In 1960, by the Hyderabad Municipal Corporation Act of 1955, Secunderabad Municipal Corporation was merged with Hyderabad Corporation to form a single Municipal Corporation. During Nizam's period, Secunderabad Cantonment was under the control of the British Raj. Today those areas, and most parts of Secunderabad where defence installations are located, is under the purview of Secunderabad Cantonment Board. There are eight civilian wards in Secunderbad Cantonment Board, with a population of four lakh.

Secunderabad Municipality office which was located on Sardar Patel Road is to be demolished for the metro rail project. The new office is located at West Marredpally.

Secunderabad forms a part of Secunderabad Lok Sabha constituency and is represented with seven legislative assembly seats. The present Member of Parliament is G. Kishan Reddy, who is also a Minister of State in the Union Cabinet. The incumbent Member of Legislative Assembly is a candidate from Telangana Rasthra Samiti (TRS), who is also a Minister under the Telangana government.

Media 
Major English dailies Deccan Chronicle and Financial Chronicle and the Telugu daily Andhra Bhoomi are published from Secunderabad. FM radio Radio Mirchi is located at SP Road in Secunderabad.

Sports 

The most-popular sport played in Secunderabad is cricket. During pre-independence era Secunderabad had various sports facilities built for serving Englishmen. Presently, no major stadiums are located in Secunderabad. However some open grounds belonging to railways and military establishments are used for various sporting activities. These are Gymkhana Ground, Parade Ground, Polo Ground, Bollarum Golf Course and Railway Golf Course. 

Various state sports associations such as Amateur Boxing Association, Basketball Association, Women's Cricket Association, Sculling and Rowing Association, and Hyderabad Hockey Association are located in Secunderabad

Transport 

The most commonly used forms of medium-distance transport in Secunderabad include government-owned services such as light railways and Telangana State Road Transport Corporation (TSRTC) buses, as well as privately operated auto rickshaws. It is connected by Secunderabad East metro station & Secunderabad West metro station of Hyderabad Metro.

The city is the headquarters of the South Central Railway Zone of the Indian Railways. It is served by Secunderabad Railway Station, one of the oldest and largest railway stations in the twin cities. Secunderabad is also a major railway junction in the Wadi–Vijayawada railway route.

Secunderabad is the hub for the city bus transport run by the TSRTC, and is connected to major destinations of both Hyderabad and Secunderabad. Major bus stations are the Jubilee Bus Station and the Rathifile Bus station.

The Tank Bund road is connects Hyderabad and Secunderabad. Abutting the Hussain Sagar lake, the Tank Bund road is an arterial road and the main thoroughfare connecting Secunderabad with Hyderabad.

The nearest airport is Rajiv Gandhi International Airport in Hyderabad, Begumpet Airport having closed in 2008.TSRTC Buses are run from Secunderabad to RGIA

Education 

Schools in Secunderabad, similar to other schools in Hyderabad and other parts of Telangana follow a 10+2+3 plan. Schools are a mix of publicly and privately run institutions, with two-thirds of students in private schools. Languages of instruction include English, Hindi, Urdu, and Telugu. Depending on the institution students are studying in, they are required to sit in the Secondary School Certificate or the Indian Certificate of Secondary Education. After completing secondary education, students enroll in schools or junior colleges with a higher secondary facility. Due to the prolonged presence of the British, Secunderabad has convent schools established by Christian missionaries.

Research institutes such as National Institute of Nutrition, Center for Cellular and Molecular Biology, Indian Institute of Chemical Technology, The English and Foreign Languages University, Osmania University, Hamstech College of Creative Education and National Geophysical Research Institute are in Tarnaka, which is close to Secunderabad and Fashion Designing Courses near Secunderabad

Notable people 

 Gummadi Vittal Rao, Poet Writer, revolutionary Telugu balladeer and local activist from pre-independence.
 Dasaradhi Rangacharya, Telugu Writer, Sahitya Akademi Award winner.
 Sunil Chhetri, most-capped Indian international footballer and the all-time top goalscorer.
 Shyam Benegal, film director and screenwriter 
 M. L. Jaisimha, test cricketer and TV commentator
 Diana Hayden, 1997 Femina Miss India and 1997 Miss World winner 
 Padmapriya Janakiraman, film actress and model
 Tanikella Bharani, actor, writer and film director
 K. N. T. Sastry, writer and film director, film critic and journalist
 James Yates, English cricketer
 Tharun Bhascker, actor, writer and film director
 Ajith Kumar, Tamil film actor
 Kenneth Anderson, writer

See also 

 Greater Hyderabad Municipal Corporation

Notes

References

External links 

 Secunderabad Community, Secunderabad Community Website
 Hyderabad-india.net, Hyderabad info
 hyderabad.org.uk, history of Secunderabad

 
Neighbourhoods in Hyderabad, India
Planned cities in India
Hyderabad district, India
1806 establishments in British India
Populated places established in 1806